Gene Brown may refer to:

 Gene Brown (basketball) (1935–2020), American basketball player
 Gene Brown (professor) (1926–2017), American professor of biochemistry
 Gene Brown (politician) (1933–1996), member of the Florida House of Representatives

See also 
 Eugene Brown (disambiguation)